Gregorio Abel Bernales Francia (born November 8, 1976 in Lima, Peru) is a Peruvian retired footballer who played as a midfielder.

Career
At the club level, Bernales played for Universitario de Deportes. He was part of the squad that became tri-champions in 2000.

Bernales has also made nine appearances for the Peru national football team.

References

External links
Gregorio Bernales at footballdatabase.eu 
 

1976 births
Living people
Footballers from Lima
Association football midfielders
Peruvian footballers
Peru international footballers
Club Deportivo Wanka footballers
Club Universitario de Deportes footballers
Sporting Cristal footballers
Total Chalaco footballers
Cobresol FBC footballers